Five ships of the United States Navy have borne the name USS Louisiana in honor of the 18th state.

  was a sloop that served in the War of 1812
  was a propeller-driven steamer that served in the American Civil War
  was a  commissioned 2 June 1906 and decommissioned 20 October 1920
  was a  cancelled before her keel was laid down
  is an  currently in active service
  was commissioned by the Confederate States of America during the American Civil War
  was a wood hull topsail schooner that served in the United States Revenue Cutter Service from 1819 to 1824

United States Navy ship names